"Barbara Allen" (Child 84, Roud 54) is a traditional folk song that is popular throughout the English-speaking world and beyond. It tells of how the eponymous character denies a dying man's love, then dies of grief soon after his untimely death.

The song began as a ballad in the seventeenth century or earlier, before quickly spreading (both orally and in print) throughout Britain and Ireland and later North America. Ethnomusicologists Steve Roud and Julia Bishop described it as "far and away the most widely collected song in the English language—equally popular in England, Scotland and Ireland, and with hundreds of versions collected over the years in North America."

As with most folk songs, "Barbara Allen" has been published and performed under many different titles, including "The Ballet of Barbara Allen", "Barbara Allen's Cruelty", "Barbarous Ellen", "Edelin", "Hard Hearted Barbary Ellen", "Sad Ballet Of Little Johnnie Green", "Sir John Graham", "Bonny Barbara Allan", "Barbry Allen" among others.

Synopsis
The ballad generally follows a standard plot, although narrative details vary between versions.

 A servant asks Barbara to attend on his sick master. 
 She visits the bedside of the heartbroken young man, who then pleads for her love.
 She refuses, claiming he had slighted her while drinking with friends.
 He dies soon after and Barbara hears his funeral bells tolling; stricken with grief, she dies as well.
 They are buried in the same church; a rose grows from his grave, a briar from hers, and the plants form a true lovers' knot.

History

A diary entry by Samuel Pepys on 2 January 1666 contains the earliest extant reference to the song. In it, he recalls the fun and games at a New Years party:

...but above all, my dear Mrs Knipp, with whom I sang; and in perfect pleasure I was to hear her sing, and especially her little Scotch song of Barbary Allen.

From this, Steve Roud and Julia Bishop have inferred the song was popular at that time, suggesting that it may have been written for stage performance, as Elizabeth Knepp was a professional actress, singer, and dancer. However, the folklorists Phillips Barry and Fannie Hardy Eckstorm were of the opinion that the song "was not a stage song at all but a libel on Barbara Villiers and her relations with Charles II". Charles Seeger points out that Pepys' delight at hearing a libelous song about the King's mistress was perfectly in character.

In 1792, the renowned Austrian composer Joseph Haydn arranged "Barbara Allen" as one of over 400 folk song arrangements commissioned by George Thomson and the publishers William Napier and William Whyte. He probably took the melody from James Oswald's Caledonian Pocket Companion, c.1750.

Early printed versions 

One 1690 broadside of the song was published in London under the title "Barbara Allen's cruelty: or, the young-man's tragedy" (see lyrics below). With Barbara Allen's [l]amentation for her unkindness to her lover, and her self". Additional printings were common in Britain throughout the eighteenth century. Scottish poet Allan Ramsay published "Bonny Barbara Allen" in his Tea-Table Miscellany published in 1740. Soon after, Thomas Percy published two similar renditions in his 1765 collection Reliques of Ancient English Poetry under the titles "Barbara Allen's Cruelty" and "Sir John Grehme and Barbara Allen". Ethnomusicologist Francis James Child compiled these renditions together in the nineteenth century with several others found in the Roxburghe Ballads to create his A and B standard versions, used by later scholars as a reference.

The ballad was first printed in the United States in 1836. Many variations of the song continued to be printed on broadsides in the United States through the 19th and 20th centuries. Throughout New England, for example, it was passed orally and spread by inclusion in songbooks and newspaper columns, along with other popular ballads such as "The Farmer's Curst Wife" and "The Golden Vanity".

The popularity of printed versions meant that lyrics from broadsides greatly influenced traditional singers; various collected versions can be traced back to different broadsides.

Traditional recordings 

According to the Vaughan Williams Memorial Library, approximately 500 traditional recordings of the song have been made. The earliest recording of the song is probably a 1907 wax cylinder recording by composer and musicologist Percy Grainger of the Lincolnshire folk singer Joseph Taylor, which was digitised by the British Library and can now be heard online via the British Library Sound Archive. Other authentic recordings include those of African American Hule "Queen" Hines of Florida (1939), Welshman Phil Tanner (1949), Irishwoman Elizabeth Cronin (early 1950s), Norfolk folk-singer Sam Larner (1958), and Appalachian folk singer Jean Ritchie (1961). Charles Seeger edited a collection released by the Library of Congress entitled Versions and Variants of Barbara Allen from the Archive of Folk Song as part of its series Folk Music of the United States. The record compiled 30 versions of the ballad, recorded from 1933 to 1954 in the United States.

Lyrics
"Barbara Allen's cruelty: or, the young-man's tragedy" (c.1690), the earliest "Barbara Allen" text:

Variations 
The lyrics are nowhere near as varied across the oral tradition as would be expected. This is because the continuous popularity of the song in print meant that variations were "corrected". Nonetheless, American folklorist Harry Smith was known to, as a party trick, ask people to sing a verse of the song, after which he would tell what county they were born in.

Setting 
The setting is sometimes "Scarlet Town". This may be a punning reference to Reading, as a slip-song version c. 1790 among the Madden songs at Cambridge University Library has 'In Reading town, where I was bound.' London town and Dublin town are used in other versions.

The ballad often opens by establishing a festive time frame, such as May, Martinmas, or Lammas. The versions which begin by mentioning "Martinmas Time" and others which begin with "Early early in the spring" are thought to be the oldest and least corrupted by more recent printed versions.

The Martinmas variants, most common in Scotland, are probably older than the Scarlet Town variants, which presumably originated in the south of England. Around half of all American versions take place in the month of May; these versions are the most diverse, as they appear to have existed within the oral tradition rather than on broadsides.

After the setting is established, a dialogue between the two characters generally follows.

Protagonists 
The dying man is called Sir John Graeme in the earliest known printings. American versions of the ballad often call him some variation of William, James, or Jimmy; his last name may be specified as Grove, Green, Grame, or another. In most English versions, the narrator is often the unnamed male protagonist.

The woman is called "Barbry" rather than "Barbara" in almost all American and versions and some English versions, and "Bawbee" in many Scottish versions. Her name is sometimes "Ellen" instead of "Allen".

Symbolism and parallels
The song often concludes with poetic motif of a rose growing from his grave and a brier from hers forming a "true lovers' knot", which symbolises their fidelity in love even after death. This motif is paralleled in several ballads including "Lord Thomas and Fair Annet", "Lord Lovel", and "Fair Margaret and Sweet William". However, the ballad lacks many of the common phrases found in ballads of similar ages (e.g. mounting a "milk white steed and a dapple" grey), possibly because the strong story and imagery means these cliches are not required.

Melody 
A vast array of tunes were traditionally used for "Barbara Allen". Many American versions are pentatonic and without a clear tonic note, such as the Ritchie family version. English versions are more rooted in the major mode. The minor-mode Scottish tune seems to be the oldest, as it is the version found in James Oswald's Caledonian Pocket Companion which was written in the mid-1700s. That tune survived in the oral tradition in Scotland until the twentieth century; a version sung by a Mrs. Ann Lyell (1869–1945) collected by James Madison Carpenter from in the 1930s can be heard on the Vaughan Williams Memorial Library website, and Ewan MacColl recorded a version learned from his mother Betsy Miller. Whilst printed versions of the lyrics influenced the versions performed by traditional singers, the tunes were rarely printed so they are thought to have been passed on from person to person through the centuries and evolved more organically.

Popular arrangements and commercial recordings
Roger Quilter wrote an arrangement in 1921, dedicated to the noted Irish baritone Frederick Ranalow, who had become famous for his performance as Macheath in The Beggar's Opera at the Lyric Theatre, Hammersmith. Quilter set each verse differently, using countermelodies as undercurrents. An octave B with a bare fifth tolls like a bell in the fourth verse. A short piano interlude before the fifth verse was commented on favourably by Percy Grainger. Quilter later incorporated the setting in his Arnold Book of Old Songs, rededicated to his late nephew Arnold Guy Vivian, and published in 1950.

Baritone vocalist Royal Dadmun released a version in 1922 on Victor Records. The song is credited to the arrangers, Eaton Faning and John Liptrot Hatton. British composer Florence Margaret Spencer Palmer published Variations on Barbara Allen for piano in 1923.

Versions of the song were recorded in the 1950s and '60s by folk revivalists, including Pete Seeger. Eddy Arnold recorded and released a version on his 1955 album "Wanderin’." The Everly Brothers recorded and released a version on their 1958 folk album, "Songs Our Daddy Taught Us." Joan Baez released a version in 1961, the same year as Jean Ritchie's recording. Bob Dylan said that folk songs were highly influential on him, writing in a poem that "[w]ithout "Barbara Allen there'd be no 'Girl from the North Country'; Dylan performed a live eight-minute rendition in 1962 which was subsequently released on Live at The Gaslight 1962.

The ballad was covered as a demo version by Simon and Garfunkel on their anthology album The Columbia Studio Recordings (1964-1970) and a bonus track on the 2001 edition of their album Sounds of Silence as "Barbriallen", and by Art Garfunkel alone in 1973 on his album Angel Clare.

Angelo Branduardi covered this song as Barbrie Allen resp. Barbriallen on his two music albums Cosi e se mi pare – EP " and Il Rovo e la rosa in Italian. On his French EN FRANÇAIS – BEST OF compilation in 2015 he sang this song in French-adaption written by Carla Bruni.

English singer-songwriter Frank Turner often covers the song a cappella during live performances. One rendition is included on the compilation album The Second Three Years.

UK folk duo Nancy Kerr & James Fagan included the song on their 2005 album Strands of Gold, and also on their 2019 live album An Evening With Nancy Kerr & James Fagan.

Popular culture adaptations and references
The song has been adapted and retold in numerous non-musical contexts. In the early twentieth century, the American writer Robert E. Howard wove verses of the song into a civil war ghost story that was posthumously published under the title ""For the Love of Barbara Allen"." Howard Richardson and William Berney's 1942 stage play Dark of the Moon is based on the ballad, as a reference to the influence of English, Irish and Scottish folktales and songs in Appalachia. It was also retold as a radio drama on the program Suspense, which aired 20 October 1952, and was entitled "The Death of Barbara Allen" with Anne Baxter in the titular role. A British radio play titled Barbara Allen featured Honeysuckle Weeks and Keith Barron; it was written by David Pownall and premiered on BBC Radio 7 on 16 February 2009.

The song has also been sampled, quoted, and featured as a dramatic device in numerous films:

Tom Brown's School Days (1940)
Scrooge (1951; released in the U.S. as A Christmas Carol)
Robin Hood Daffy (1958; Warner Brothers cartoon)
The Buccaneer (1958), sung by Claire Bloom.
Parker Adderson, Philosopher (1974; short film)
Jane Campion's Oscar-winning The Piano (1993)
Best in Show (2000)
A Love Song for Bobby Long (2004)

References

External links

Late 17th-century English broadside printing of "Barbara Allen's Cruelty", via the British Library's Roxburghe collection
Scan of "Bonny Barbara Allen" in 1904 edition of Child's English and Scottish Popular Ballads at Google Books
Recording of "Barbara Allen" as performed by Frank Luther in 1928 at Project Gutenberg
Scan of "Barbara Allan" broadside printed in 1855
Contemporary sheet music for one version of the song
Online transcripts of Barbara Allen
Recordings for the ballad are also available at the English Broadside Ballad Archive at University of California, Santa Barbara
 A list of performances and recordings of the song can be found at Mainly Norfolk.

In 1994 Guitarist Edward Flower recorded a classical guitar duet of Barbara Allen for a CD entitled "Chords and Thyme" Folksongs from England, Scotland, Wales, Ireland and America.  Mr. Flower published through Mel Bay publications a companion book of sheet music.

American poems
Bob Dylan songs
British poems
Child Ballads
Joan Baez songs
Burl Ives songs
Glen Campbell songs
Jo Stafford songs
Jean Ritchie songs
Appalachian culture
American folk songs
17th-century songs
Songwriter unknown